Aaron Jeffcoate (born 23 July 1993) is a British actor from Staffordshire UK, best known for his roles in The Terror, Casualty, Shameless and Doctors. He started his acting career at the age of 12 when he took part in several theatre productions. Since then he has appeared in a number of feature films, shorts films, TV series, commercials and music videos.

Television

Films

References

External links

Living people
1988 births
British male film actors
English male television actors
Actors from Staffordshire